Verão 90 (English title: The Incredible '90s) is a Brazilian telenovela produced and broadcast by TV Globo. It premiered on 29 January 2019, replacing O Tempo Não Para, and ended on 26 July 2019, being replaced by Bom Sucesso. It was created by Izabel de Oliveira and Paula Amaral in collaboration with Daisy Chaves, Isabel Muniz, João Brandão, and Luciane Reis. It was directed by Ana Paula Guimarães, Diego Morais, and Tila Teixeira, with the general direction of Jorge Fernando and Marcelo Zambelli and the artistic direction of Jorge Fernando. Verão 90 features Isabelle Drummond, Rafael Vitti, Jesuíta Barbosa, Cláudia Raia, Dira Paes, Klebber Toledo, Humberto Martins, and Camila Queiroz in the main roles.

Plot 
In 1980, when she was only ten years old, Manuzita was the host of her own television program, but she is forced to start a contest to find a co-star or the show would be canceled. Brothers João and Jerônimo sneak off to the auditions and are both chosen. The trio form the group Patotinha Mágica, which became a huge national success. While Manuzita and João gained attention as a couple, Jerônimo was left out by the press and develops a hatred for his brother. During a huge performance, João gets sick and faints onstage. His mother (Dira Paes) is accused of negligence and the case ends up in the main newspapers, causing the termination of advertising contracts and the group to disband. Ten years later, in 1990, Manu (Isabelle Drummond) is an actress, but has not been successful and tries to regain her fame, accepting any work to achieve it. João (Rafael Vitti) is the host of a radio program and Jerônimo (Jesuíta Barbosa) has gambling debts. When her car breaks down, Manu is reunited with João and they begin to date, causing jealousy from Jerônimo.

Also seeking fame, Jerônimo returned to Rio de Janeiro, lying that he was the son of diplomats, to win the friendship of millionaires Quinzinho (Caio Paduan), Candé (Kayky Brito) and Tobé (Bernardo Marinho), with the help of scammer Galdino (Gabriel Godoy) and lover Vanessa (Camila Queiroz). Despite his lie being discovered, Jerônimo got a high position at PopTV, as compensation when he helped free Quinzinho from jail, after he accidentally caused the death of VJ Nicole (Barbara France), setting up João to be arrested instead. Three years have passed and, in 1993, João has the chance to prove his innocence when he is released, much to the dismay of Jerônimo, who managed not only to maintain his standard of living, but also to stay with Manu. In addition, Vanessa returns from abroad to take revenge on her ex-lover after he left her in the past.

Cast 
 Isabelle Drummond as Manuela Renata Andrade (Manu / Manuzita) 
 Rafael Vitti as João Guerreiro
 Jesuíta Barbosa as Jerônimo Guerreiro / Rojê Guerreiro 
 Cláudia Raia as Lidiane Andrade / Lidi Pantera
 Dira Paes as Janaína Guerreiro
 Humberto Martins as Herculano Mendes / Hércules Gatão
 Camila Queiroz as Vanessa Dias 
 Klebber Toledo as Patrick Vandenbergh Brasil 
 Flávio Tolezani as Raimundo
 Débora Nascimento as Gisela Ferreira Lima Mendes (Gigi)
 Fabiana Karla as Madalena Sampaio (Madá)
 Marcos Veras as Álamo Sampaio 
 Alexandre Borges as Joaquim Ferreira Lima (Quinzão) 
 Totia Meireles as Mercedes Ferreira Lima
 Caio Paduan as Joaquim Ferreira Lima Filho (Quinzinho)
 Marina Moschen as Larissa Almeida de Castro Gomes
 Kayky Brito as Carlos André Almeida de Castro Gomes (Candé)
 Cláudia Ohana as Janice Guerreiro
 Miguel Rômulo as Leonardo Farias / Sabrina
 Sérgio Malheiros as Diego Guerreiro Pereira
 Jeniffer Nascimento as Cristina Moura (Kika)
 Gabriel Godoy as Galdino Camargo 
 Luiz Henrique Nogueira as Jofre Araújo (Jofre Cachorrão)
 Marcelo Valle as Murilo Fraga
 Maria Carol Rebello as Diana Mendes
 Val Perré as Otoniel Pereira
 Dandara Mariana as Dandara Brasil
 Bernardo Marinho as Tobias Cassini (Tobé)
 Renata Motta Lima as Vera Regina
 Giovana Cordeiro as Moana Aguiar
 Marília Martins as Dirce
 Alexandre David as Floriano
 Ícaro Silva as Ticiano
 Marcela Siqueira as Tânia
 Renata Imbriani as Marta
 Felippe Luhan as Manjubinha
 Ivo Gandra as Codorna
 André Junqueira as Lacerda
 Lucas Domso as Jorge Figueira (“Figueirinha”)
 Orlando Caldeira as Catraca
 Duda Wendling as Isadora Ferreira Lima Mendes
 Alana Cabral as Clarissa Guerreiro Pereira

Guest cast 
 Barbara França as Nicole Ferraz
 Lazuli Barbosa as Adriana
 Pamela Côto as Flavinha
 Tarcísio Filho as Alexander Hall, Duque de Kiev (Duke of Kiev)
 Adriana Machado as Marina

Production 
Originally entitled Anos Incríveis (Incredible Years), the telenovela began to be developed by Izabel de Oliveira and Paula Amaral in the second half of 2015 and had the synopsis approved in March 2016. Originally it was planned to premiere in January 2018, replacing Pega Pega. In February 2017, however, it was decided that it would premiere in the second half of 2018, giving its place to Deus Salve o Rei, as a strategy to compete with Record's historical dramas. In August 2017 the telenovela changed its name to Verão 90 Graus (Summer 90 Degrees) and later shortened to Verão 90 (Summer '90), since Anos Incríveis belonged to ABC as the title of the series The Wonder Years in Brazil. In March 2018 it was announced that Verão 90 would be postponed again, giving its place to O Tempo Não Para, which until then would be its replacement. The second postponement was due to the fact that the plot addresses the consequences of the Collor Plan, however it came up against the possible candidacy of Fernando Collor de Mello in the 2018 elections, which could be seen as negative propaganda. In addition, the broadcaster was having trouble obtaining the copyright for several music videos from the 1990s, as it intended to show part of them constantly during the story. Because of the postponements, several cast members ended up being moved to other telenovelas.

The telenovela initially would be directed by Natália Grimberg and Allan Fiterman, however, after the postponements, both moved to other projects, and were replaced by Jorge Fernando and Marcelo Zambelli. Verão 90 was the last telenovela directed by Jorge Fernando, who would pass away on 27 October 2019, three months after the last episode had aired. The sets of the telenovela were developed by the set designer José Claudio Ferreira, who took six months to produce them completely. The team's main difficulty was to faithfully reproduce the city of Rio de Janeiro in the 1990s, including famous places frequented by young people in addition to typical elements such as yellow pay phones and street signs of the time. Filming began in October 2018, and concluded in June 2019.

Ratings

Soundtrack

Volume 1

Verão 90: Vol. 1 is the first soundtrack of the telenovela, released on 13 March 2019 by Som Livre.

Volume 2

Verão 90: Vol. 2 is the second soundtrack of the telenovela, released on 5 April 2019 by Som Livre.

Awards and nominations

References

External links 
  
 

2019 telenovelas
TV Globo telenovelas
Brazilian telenovelas
2019 Brazilian television series debuts
2019 Brazilian television series endings
Brazilian LGBT-related television shows
Gay-related television shows
Comedy telenovelas
Television shows set in Rio de Janeiro (city)
Television series set in 1980
Television series set in the 1990s
Portuguese-language telenovelas
Works about the Russian Mafia